Hodk is a village in Kuhpayeh (Kuohsorkh-e-gharbi) Rural District Rural District, in the Central District of Kashmar County, Razavi Khorasan Province, Iran. At the 2006 census, its population was 499, in 174 families.

References 

Populated places in Bardaskan County